Adriano Francisco de Moura (born April 12, 1988) is a Brazilian footballer who plays for Puerto Rico United in the USL Professional Division.

Career

Youth
Francisco played for various clubs in Brazil before moving to the United States.

Professional
Francisco played with Atlético San Juan in Puerto Rico in 2009, and with the Hollywood United Hitmen in the USL Premier Development League in the summer of 2010 before transferring to Bregalnica Štip in Maceonia. He made his debut for Bregalnica Štip on 7 August in a 2-1 victory over Škendija.

References

External sources
 Adriano Francisco at Macedonian Football.

1988 births
Living people
Footballers from Rio de Janeiro (city)
Brazilian footballers
Brazilian expatriate footballers
Hollywood United Hitmen players
USL League Two players
FK Bregalnica Štip players
Puerto Rico United players
USL Championship players
Expatriate footballers in North Macedonia
Association football forwards
Brazilian expatriate sportspeople in the United States
Expatriate soccer players in the United States
Brazilian expatriate sportspeople in North Macedonia
Expatriate footballers in Puerto Rico
Brazilian expatriate sportspeople in Puerto Rico